FC Dynamo Vladivostok is a Russian football team from Vladivostok.

Club history
Dynamo played on the amateur level for most of its history, with the exception of second-tier 1957 Soviet Class B participation. The club was also dissolved and recreated several times.

In 2021, it was recreated once more and was licensed for the third-tier Russian FNL 2 for the 2021–22 season.

FC Luch Vladivostok represented the city in the Russian Premier League previously, before going bankrupt in 2020.

Current squad
As of 22 February 2023, according to the Second League website.

References

Association football clubs established in 1944
Football clubs in Russia
Sports clubs  in Vladivostok
1944 establishments in Russia